Ferdinand Plitzner (1678—1724) was a German cabinet maker, remembered for his elaborate furniture with Boulle marquetry, and the Spiegelkabinett, a mirrored porcelain room that he created in 1719 at Schloss Weissenstein for Lothar Franz von Schönborn.

References 
 The Grove Encyclopedia of Decorative Arts, Volume 1, edited by Gordon Campbell, Oxford University Press, 2006, page . .
 Oxford Reference entry

German cabinetmakers